Frederick Wilson Warren (1887-1959) was a Canadian architect and politician in Hamilton, Ontario, Canada. He was a member of the Co-operative Commonwealth Federation, and served as the member of provincial parliament in the electoral district of Hamilton—Wentworth from August 1943 until March 1945.

References 

1887 births
1959 deaths
Canadian architects
Ontario Co-operative Commonwealth Federation MPPs
Politicians from Hamilton, Ontario